Eleanor of Woodstock (18 June 1318 – 22 April 1355) was an English princess and the duchess of Guelders by marriage to Reginald II of Guelders. She was regent as the guardian of their minor son Reginald III from 1343 until 1344. She was a younger sister of Edward III of England.

Early life

Eleanor was born at Woodstock Palace in Oxfordshire to King Edward II of England and Isabella of France. Eleanor was named after her paternal grandmother, Eleanor of Castile. £333 was given for her churching by her father. In 1324 she was taken into care by her cousin Eleanor de Clare then sent to the care of Ralph de Monthermer and Isabella Hastings with her younger sister Joan of the Tower at Pleshey. In 1325, there were negotiations between England and Castile for Eleanor to be betrothed to Alphonso XI of Castile, but this fell through due to the dowry.

In early 1328 Eleanor's new sister-in-law, Philippa of Hainaut, wife of Edward III, became Eleanor's guardian. In 1329, during the minority government, negotiations were underway for a match between Eleanor and the future John II of France; the following year the prospective bridegroom was Pedro, son of Alphonso IV of Aragon, but these negotiations fell through also.

Duchess of Guelders
In May 1332 Eleanor married the count of Guelders, Reinoud II "the black" (English: Reginald), of the House of Wassenberg (born c. 1287), a marriage arranged by her brother, Edward III, and her mother's cousin Joan of Valois. The groom, quite dark of colour and according to chronicles, also of character, was a widower with four daughters. He was known for, among other things, having imprisoned his father for over six years.

As Eleanor sailed from Sandwich, her wedding trousseau included a wedding gown of Spanish cloth, caps, gloves, shoes, a bed, rare spices and loaves of sugar. She was well received in Guelders.

According to legend, she was sent from court in 1338 under the pretext that she had leprosy. Her husband was reportedly under the influence of the priest Jan Moliart, who had been active in her exile and the false pretense of her alleged leprosy. During her supposed exile, she is said to have stayed in Deventer; she does appear to have been active as the protector of the Franciscan Friars, and a financier of their new church.

Again according to legend, her husband tried to annul the marriage. Although there is no firm evidence to support this story, which finds parallels in the legends surrounding numerous other royal women, Eleanor turned up in Court in Nijmegen to contest the annulment, and proceeded to strip down, proving she was no leper, and thus forcing her husband to take her back. He died from a fall from his horse on 12 October 1343.

Regency
When she was widowed, Eleanor became the regent of Guelders for her nine-year-old son Reginald. Having assumed power, she had her old enemy Jan Moliart arrested and imprisoned.  Her regency was formally recognised, but she was forced to confront a relative of her late husband, Jan van Valkenburg, who demanded his right to share the regency with her.
The situation was soon so difficult that, according to some accounts, she was forced to resign her post of regency, and her son was formally declared of legal majority and therefore of no need of a regency at the age of eleven in 1344.

After her resignation she formally retired under the title Lady of Veluwe (after the name of her dowry), and spent much of her time acting as a benefactor of convents, particular the beggar convents such as the Order of Saint Clare.

During the 1350s, she and Reginald came in conflict over making peace with his younger brother Edward, and he confiscated her lands.

Death and burial
On 22 April 1355, twelve years after she became a widow, Eleanor died at age 36. According to legend, she had been too proud to ask her brother Edward III for help and was buried in the Franciscan church in Deventer. Her tombstone had the simple inscription ELEANOR on it; however, in England, on the south side of Philippa of Hainault's tomb in Westminster Abbey there is an image of her and her husband.

Issue
Eleanor had two sons:

 Reginald III, Duke of Guelders, called "The Fat" (1333–1371)
 Edward, Duke of Guelders (1336–1371).

Ancestry

References

1318 births
1355 deaths
14th-century English people
14th-century women rulers
House of Plantagenet
House of Wassenberg
English princesses
Daughters of kings
Children of Edward II of England